Neocyematidae is a family of fishes in the order Saccopharyngiforms. This family, established from five described adult specimens of the species Neocyema erythrosoma, was originally thought to be a part of the family Cyematidae, until genomic sequencing in 2018 refuted this relationship.

Description
Neocyema is known for its vivid orange color and paedomorphic life cycle. One distinguishing feature of this group are the semi-extended jaws, which separate it from Cyematidae. The eyes of the adult form are reduced during the transition from larvae to adulthood, indicating a likelihood of blindness. The larval stage displays no black colorings, in contrast to the larval stages of other saccopharyngiformes, and look similar to the orders of Eupharynx and Saccopharynx, whereas the adult stage more resembles Cyema.

Distribution
Neocyema erythrosoma has currently only been observed in the North and South Atlantic Ocean, but its larvae have been discovered in the Sargasso Sea.

References

Eels
Deep sea fish
Ray-finned fish families